Jan Mirza (also Romanized as Jān Mīrzā) is a village in Nimbeluk Rural District, Nimbeluk District, Qaen County, South Khorasan Province, Iran. At the 2006 census, its population was 118, in 28 families.

References 

Populated places in Qaen County